Cardiaspina retator is a bug species in the genus Cardiaspina, found on Eucalyptus species in Australia.

References

External links 

 Cardiaspina retator at psyllist

Aphalaridae
Insects described in 1962
Hemiptera of Australia